The list of Mister Vietnam to represent to Mister World, Mister International, Manhunt International, Mister Supranational, Mister Global, Man of the World, Mister Model International, Mister Universe Model, Mister Tourism World, Mister Universal Ambassador, Best Model of the World and Mr. Asia Contest

Mister Vietnam

Regional rankings

Grand Slam Pageants 
Color keys

Mister World 
As of 2007 for debuting at Mister World pageant. Vietnamese Male Model will be competing at the pageant by appointing.

Mister International 
As of 2008 for debuting at Mister International pageant. Mister Vietnam winner represented Vietnam at the pageant.

Manhunt International 
As of 2002 for debuting at Manhunt International pageant. The Manhunt Vietnam winner will compete at the pageant.

Mister Global 
As of 2014 for debuting at Mister Global pageant. The Mister Global Vietnam winner will compete at the pageant.

Mister Supranational 
As of 2019 for debuting at Mister Supranational pageant. Vietnamese Male Model winner will compete at the pageant.

Man of the World

Minor International Pageants 
Color keys

Mister Grand International

Man of the Year

Mister National Universe

Mister Continental International

Mister Friendship International

Mister Culture World

Man Hot Star International

World Fitness Supermodel

Mister Universal Ambassador

Mister United World

Mister United Continents

Mister Tourism World

Mister Universe Tourism

Altitude Men International

Mister Model of The World

Mister Tourism and Culture Universe

Mister Ocean

Mister Icon World

Mister Asian International

Mister Asia

Mister Diversity Culture International

Ambassador of the World

Teen Pageants 
Color keys

Mister Global Teen

Prince & Princess International

Mister Teen Glam International

See also 

 Miss Vietnam
 Miss Universe Vietnam
 Miss World Vietnam
 Miss Vietnam World
 Miss Supranational Vietnam
 Miss Earth Vietnam

References

External links 

Beauty pageants in Vietnam
Male beauty pageants
Man of the World (pageant)
Mister Global by country